Glenormiston Station, commonly known as Glenormiston, is a pastoral lease that operates as a cattle station in Queensland, Australia.

Description
Located at the top of the Channel Country the property shares a boundary with Marion Downs Station. The Georgina River flows through the north eastern part of the property as it journeys southward further into the channel country.

The land on the property is described as being composed of open and broken downs, with river and creek flats, low limestone ridges, inferior flats and rough hills. An assessing commissioner also noted that it is light carrying country, safe if not over-stocked and is excellent country for raising an fattening heavy cattle.

History
The Wongkadjera were one of the tribes local to this area and aboriginals once traded Pituri north along the Georgina River into Wangka-yutyurru country and south along the Mulligan River to the Lake Eyre system. The creek near the homestead is named Pituri Creek and it flows into Lake Idamea. J.A. Coglan lived in the homestead in the 1890s.

The station was established in 1877 along with several other well known properties in the Channel Country as pastoralists expanded westward from the grasslands at the headwaters of the Diamantina. Other properties established at the same time included Marion Downs Station, Headingly Station, Herbert Downs, Noranside and Roxburgh Downs.

The station was put up for auction in 1881 by its owner, Walter Douglas. The lands were described as "open rolling downs with saltbush and cotton bush, thickly grassed with Mitchell grass and other varieties. Interspersed with open patches of gidyah, mulga and other timbers." Later the same year an unfortunate cook, who had only taken up the position a couple of days earlier, was killed by Aboriginals in the area.
The station was successfully sold at auction to Mr William Kelman.

The Georgina River and the Diamatina Rivers both were flooded and the nearby Sandringham station was submerged.

At some point prior to 1890 the station changed hands and the new owner was James Tyson who owned several other stations including Tupra, Mooroonowa, Juanbung and Bangate in New South Wales and Meteor Downs, Albinia, Mount Russell and Tinnenburra in Queensland.

The property was stocked with 25,000 cattle in 1890. In 1893 the region was struck by a terrible drought and the station would be thought to be lucky to be able to muster 10,000 cattle, with carcasses laying all over the property. Drought struck again in 1897 but to a lesser extent.

Tyson died in 1898, Glenormiston was stocked with about 10,048 cattle and 220 horses at this time. The station sold later that year to Collins, White and Co. along with Carnarvon and Babiloora Stations in the Warrego district.

Rabbits were first seen at the station in the late 1890s with at least one permanent colony known to be located near Toco lake on the station which was the furthest north that the rabbit had ventured in 1899.

A meteorite, known as the Glenormiston meteorite, was found on the station by the manager Mr F. H. Story, in 1925. Story sold the object to the University of Queensland in 1926.

The area was struck by drought in 1952.

In 1955 the property was completely cut off by floodwaters. A Trans Australia Airlines aeroplane was chartered to do an airdrop of food to the property which had been without fresh food for a week.

The North Australian Pastoral Company acquired Glenormiston in 1968. The adjoining property, Marion Downs, was acquired at about the same time. Stephen and Narda Bryce moved to the property in 2001 and Stephen was still managing the property and about ten staff in 2012. The property has a carrying capacity of about 7000 head of cattle depending on the season.

Moderate flooding was experienced at Glenormiston in 2010 following heavy rains locally and further north in the Georgina catchment.

See also

List of ranches and stations
List of the largest stations in Australia

References

Stations (Australian agriculture)
Pastoral leases in Queensland
Central West Queensland
1877 establishments in Australia